Puttenham may refer to:

 Puttenham, Hertfordshire, England
 Puttenham, Surrey, England
 George Puttenham (1529–1590), English literary critic
 HMS Puttenham, a 1956 Ham class minesweeper

See also
 Puttenham Common